John Roderick Brathwaite was an English footballer who played for Fulham between 1984 and 1988. Roderick was a striker who scored 2 goals in 13 appearances for the club. He also played twice for England.

References

Year of birth missing (living people)
Living people
English footballers
Fulham F.C. players
English Football League players
Association football forwards